Trench railways represented military adaptation of early 20th-century railway technology to the problem of keeping soldiers supplied during the static trench warfare phase of World War I. The large concentrations of soldiers and artillery at the front lines required delivery of enormous quantities of food, ammunition and fortification construction materials where transport facilities had been destroyed.  Reconstruction of conventional roads (at that time rarely surfaced) and railways was too slow, and fixed facilities were attractive targets for enemy artillery. Trench railways linked the front with standard gauge railway facilities beyond the range of enemy artillery. Empty cars often carried litters returning wounded from the front.

Overview 
France had developed portable Decauville railways for agricultural areas, small-scale mining and temporary construction projects. France had standardized  narrow gauge Decauville military equipment and Germany adopted similar feldbahn of the same gauge. British War Department Light Railways and the United States Army Transportation Corps used the French  narrow gauge system. Russia used Decauville  narrow gauge and  narrow gauge systems.

Unskilled labourers and soldiers could quickly assemble prefabricated  sections of track weighing about  along roads or over smooth terrain. The track distributed heavy loads to minimize development of muddy ruts through unpaved surfaces. Small locomotives pulled short trains of  capacity cars through areas of minimum clearance and small-radius curves. Derailments were common, but the light rolling stock was relatively easy to rerail.  Steam locomotives typically carried a short length of flexible pipe (called a water-lifter) to refill water tanks from flooded shell holes.

Steam locomotives produced smoke that revealed their location to enemy artillery and aircraft.  They required fog or darkness to operate within visual range of the front.  Daylight transport usually required animal power until internal combustion locomotives were developed.  Large quantities of hay and grain were carried to the front as horses in warfare remained essential to logistics.  Fodder for horses constituted the single biggest commodity exported from Britain to France during the war.

French equipment 
French equipment was largely designed on the initiative of Artillery Captain Prosper Péchot beginning in 1888. The  Fairlie articulated 0-4-4-0T Péchot-Bourdon locomotive was named for him and engineer Bourdon of the 5th engineer regiment (5e régiment du génie) in Toul. Prior to outbreak of war  of military  track were stockpiled at Toul, along with 20 locomotives and 150 wagons.

The French military had 62 Péchot-Bourdon type built between 1888 and 1914. Baldwin Locomotive Works built 280 more during the war. The "Système Péchot" as it is named in French became the dominant system for trench railways with an estimated  of track built by the 5th engineer regiment.

250  0-6-0T of Decauville's Progres design were built for military service. 32 0-6-0T of American design and 600  gasoline mechanical locomotives were purchased from Baldwin Locomotive Works.

The Maginot Line employed a  gauge supply system of petrol-powered armoured locomotives and underground electric locomotives pulling cars of World War I design. Two Péchot-Bourdon locomotives were preserved in the technical museums of Dresden and the railway museum of Požega. A portion of the Somme battlefield railway continued in operation and has been preserved as the heritage Froissy Dompierre Light Railway.

German equipment 

Orenstein and Koppel GmbH manufactured portable track. Krauss designed a 0-6-0T Zwillinge intended to be operated in pairs with the cabs together. The Zwillinge offered Mallet locomotive performance through tight curves, but damage to one unit would not disable the second. One hundred-eighty-two Zwillinge were manufactured from 1890 to 1903, and shortcomings were evaluated in German South West Africa and China's Boxer Rebellion.

An  0-8-0T Brigadelok design with Klien-Lindner articulation of the front and rear axles was adopted as the new military standard in 1901. Approximately 250 were available by 1914, and over two thousand were produced during the war. A Brigadelok typically handled six loaded cars up a 2% grade.

Germany also had approximately five hundred 0-4-0T, three hundred 0-6-0T and forty 0-10-0T locomotives of other designs in military service.

Deutz AG produced two hundred 4-wheel internal combustion locomotives with an evaporative cooling water jacket surrounding the single cylinder oil engine. Fifty similar 6-wheel locomotives were produced by Deutz.

Approximately 20% of the Brigadeloks saw post-war use. Government railways of (Yugoslavia), North Macedonia, Serbia and Poland made extensive use of the military locomotives. Significant numbers were used in Hungary, France, Latvia, Bulgaria and Romania while smaller numbers went overseas to Africa, Indonesia, Japan and North America. Much of the trench railway equipment remaining in Belgium at the end of hostilities was shipped to the Belgian Congo to build the Vicicongo line.

British equipment 

Britain selected a Hunslet Engine Company 4-6-0T design as their standard for the French Decauville 600mm rail gauge; but Hunslet's production of 75 locomotives was insufficient. Baldwin Locomotive Works produced 495  4-6-0T of a less satisfactory American design while Hudswell Clarke and Andrew Barclay Sons & Co. built 83 0-6-0T locomotives. One hundred  2-6-2T of the American standard military design were later purchased from Alco's Cooke Locomotive Works for British use.

Britain pioneered the use of petrol-powered, 4-wheel synchromesh mechanical drive locomotives (known as tractors) for daylight use within visual range of the front. Early tractors weighed 2 tons. Total production was 102  Ernest E. Baguley tractors, 580  Motor Rail tractors and 220  Motor Rail tractors. An additional two hundred  petrol-electric tractors were produced by British Westinghouse and Dick, Kerr & Co.

Former British trench railway equipment was put to civilian use rebuilding Vis-en-Artois between Arras and Cambrai. Twenty Hudswell-Clarke and Barclay 0-6-0T, seven Alco 2-6-2T and 26 Baldwin 4-6-0T engines saw service until 1957.

American equipment 
Baldwin Locomotive Works produced  2-6-2T numbered 5001-5195. Number 5195 was sent to Davenport Locomotive Works as a pattern for their production of the design, while another was sent to the Magor Car Corporation to test operation of their military railway car production. Two were lost at sea, and the remaining 191 saw service with the U.S. Army in France. Locomotives were initially painted grey with black smoke boxes. White lettering was applied to early production, but black lettering was used in France. Baldwin also built   and   4-wheel gasoline mechanical locomotives for the U.S. Army. The lighter locomotives were numbered 8001-8063.

The boxcars and tank cars were regarded as top-heavy and prone to derailment; so most loads were carried on flatcars and gondolas. Approximately 1,600 4-wheel side dump cars were produced in several versions for construction earthmoving. The total number of cars shipped to Europe was 2,385.

Davenport Locomotive Works built one hundred  2-6-2T and Vulcan Iron Works built thirty more. Whitcomb Locomotive Works built 74  4-wheel gasoline mechanical locomotives. None of the Davenport, Vulcan and Whitcomb production saw overseas service, but some survived to World War II on United States military bases including Fort Benning, Georgia, Fort Sill, Oklahoma, Fort Benjamin Harrison, Indiana, Fort Dix, New Jersey and an arsenal in Alabama.

Russian equipment 
During the First World War Russia used both French  Decauville and  gauge systems. Kolomna Locomotive Works built 0-6-0T locomotives (I, N, R, T series). 70 locomotives were purchased from ALCO. Baldwin Locomotive Works built 350 seven-tonne 6-wheel gasoline mechanical locomotives for Russia's  gauge in 1916.

See also 

 Decauville
 Feldbahn
 Heeresfeldbahn
 War Department Light Railways
 Light railways
 Military cableways in the First World War
 Military railways
 Voie Sacrée

References

Bibliography

External links

Military railways
Military logistics of World War I
600 mm gauge railways
750 mm gauge railways